Henry Arnold may refer to:
  (1879–1945), French sculptor
 Henry H. Arnold (1886–1950), American general officer
 Henry J. Arnold (born 1866), mayor of Denver, Colorado

See also
Harry Arnold (disambiguation) 
Henry H. Arnhold (1921–2018), American banker